Devoted Spirits: A Tribute to Earth Wind and Fire is a tribute album to  the R&B band Earth, Wind & Fire by the band Devoted Spirits which consists of former EWF members Larry Dunn, Sheldon Reynolds and Morris Pleasure.
The album was released in 2004 on Thump Records.

Track listing

References

2004 albums
Earth, Wind & Fire tribute albums